= Fellowship Society of Charleston, South Carolina =

Charitable organization based in Charleston, South Carolina

- Founded: April 4, 1762; 264 years ago
- Founder: Edward Weyman
- Headquarters: Charleston, South Carolina

The Fellowship Society of Charleston, South Carolina is a benevolent organization located in Charleston, South Carolina founded by Edward Waymen (1730-1792) in 1762. It is a charitable organization that was founded to help "the poor, sick, and destitute" in the Charleston area.

The main archive of the Society's papers are held in the College of Charleston's Special Collections library department.

== History ==
The Fellowship Society was founded in 1762, with Edward Waymen as the founding President. The Fellowship Society claims, despite official records, that James Brown, Robert Cripps, John Troup and Isaac Huger, Darby Pendergrass, and others were involved in the original meeting that founded the organization. The organization was incorporated after the approval of the British crown in 1769. Membership was often exclusive to planters and mechanics/craftsmen.

The original purpose of the organization was to assist with medical care by building a hospital, and to provide for widows and orphan children in need. The organization's goals later shifted from building a hospital to educating poor children in Charleston, which culminated in a $3,000 donation that created the Memminger Normal School. The original mission of the society was carried on by an Auxiliary Fellowship Society between 1895-1921 to create an annual fund and assist with ill Society members.

Today, the organization is involved in fundraising and donations to organized charities.

== Presidents ==
The Fellowship Society compiled a list of 105 Presidents from 1762 to 2019:

- Edward Waymen – 1st President (1762-1770)
- James Brown – 2nd President (1771)
- Robert Cripps – 3rd President (1772)
- Edward Oats – 4th President (1773)
- John Troup – 5th President (1774)
- Thomas Grimball – 6th President (1775)
- Isaac Huger – 7th President (1776)
- Samuel Prioleau – 8th President (1777)
- Daniel Cannon – 9th President (1778)
- John Huger – 10th President (1779)
- Hopson Pinckney – 11th President (1780)
- John Troup – 12th President (1781-1782)
- John Huger – 13th President (1783)
- Dr. Tucker Harris – 14th President (1784)
- Daniel Cannon – 15th President (1785)
- Richard Lushington – 16th President (1786)
- Hugh Swinton – 17th President (1787)
- Thomas Cochran – 18th President (1788)
- Dr. Richard Savage – 19th President (1789)
- Edward Weyman – 20th President (1790-1791)
- Robert Knox – 21st President (1792)
- Peter Bounetheau – 22nd President (1793-1795)
- Wiliam Wilkie – 23rd President (1796-1798)
- Hugh Swinton – 24th President (1799-1800)
- William Hasell Gibbes – 25th President (1801-1805)
- Thomas Hinds Gibbes – 26th President (1806-1807)
- Robert Howard – 27th President (1808-1810)
- Charles John Steedman – 28th President (1811-1812)
- Richard Yeadon – 29th President (1813-1814)
- Stephen West Moore – 30th President (1815-1817)
- Charles John Steedman – 31st President (1828-1837)
- Richard Yeadon Jr – 32nd President (1838-1869)
- Charles H. Simonton – 33rd President (1870-1875)
- Virginius J. Tobias – 34th President (1876-1878)
- William L. Dagget – 35th President (1879-1880)
- William J. Gayer – 36th President (1881-1882)
- H. L. P. Bolger – 37th President (1883-1884)
- John Henry Seyle – 38th President (1885)
- Daniel B. Gilliland – 39th President (1886-1889)
- Charles Kerrison Jr. – 40th President (1890)
- John G. Chalk – 41st President (1891-1892)
- Edward Perry – 42nd President (1893-1895)
- Bartholomew G. Mazyck – 43rd President (1896-1904)
- Richard C. Merritt – 44th President (1905-1906)
- Louis D. Mahlstedt – 45th President (1907-1909)
- Meyer Frank – 46th President (1910-1911)
- Meyer Frank – 47th President (1910-1911)
- Robert G. O'Neal – 48th President (1912-1913)
- Arthur Albert Everett – 49th President (1914)
- Thomas B. McCarthy – 50th President (1915-1917)
- T. Kinlock Jervey – 51st President (1918-1919)
- Julius E. Burgess – 52nd President (1920-1921)
- Robert C. Tharin – 53rd President (1922)
- Hampton Kelly Livingston – 54th President (1923-1924)
- C. A. Suedberg – 55th President (1925)
- Henry H. Ridgeway – 56th President (1926-1927)
- Jacob C. Muller – 57th President (1928-1930)
- E. Taliaferro Heyward – 58th President (1931-1933)
- Clarence S. Cochran – 59th President (19341-935)
- Thomas B. McCarthy – 60th President (1936-1937)
- Percy Eugene Wilbur – 61st President (1938-1929)
- Virgil D. Svendsen – 62nd President (1940-1941)
- Howard H. Lamar – 63rd President (1942-1943)
- Michael L. Runey – 64th President (1944-1945)
- Mars C. Costa – 65th President (1946-1947)
- Elias T. Holcombe – 66th President (1948-1949)
- Henry M. Lilienthal – 67th President (1950-1951)
- John J. Meeks – 68th President (1952-1953)
- B. Marvin Edmondson –69th President (1954-1955)
- Vincent M. French – 70th President (1956)
- Julian K. Johns – 71st President (1957-1958)
- Robert E. Molony – 72nd President (1959-1960)
- D. Frank Miles – 73rd President (1961)
- Robert N. Bennett – 74th President (1962)
- Albert C. H. Bullwinkel – 75th President (1963-1964)
- M. Otis Spyers – 76th President (1965-1966)
- Bernhard Karl Jantzen – 77th President (1967-1968)
- Fred W. Weber – 78th President (1969-1970)
- James E. Stuckey – 79th President (1971-1972)
- James U. Mitchell – 80th President (1973-1974)
- Jacob C. Rowell – 81st President (1975-1976)
- Frank O. Grayson – 82nd President (1977-1978)
- Victor I. Bull – 83rd President (1979-1980)
- Eugene P. Hans – 84th President (1981-1982)
- Clifton G. Friend – 85th President (1983-1984)
- Joseph A. Black – 86th President (1985-1986)
- Shawn S. Hans – 87th President (1987-1988)
- James H. Westendorff – 88th President (1989-1990)
- William R. Clair Jr. – 89th President (1991-1992)
- Richard A. Mathewes – 90st President (1993-1994)
- E. Clifton Singleton – 91st President (1995-1996)
- Manning L. Masche – 92nd President (1997-1998)
- Roger W. Nelson – 93rd President (1999-2000)
- Hugh L. Black – 94th President (2001-2002)
- John W. Wiggins – 95th President (2003-2004)
- Thomas C. Corbett – 96th President (2005)
- James B. Wilson – 97th President (2006)
- David C. Corbett – 98th President (2007)
- Robert C. McKay Jr. – 99th President (2008)
- John C. Hassell – 100th President (2009-2010)
- Jack D. Lee – 101st President (2011-2012)
- Richard D. Stiglbauer – 102nd President (2013-2015)
- David H. Jaffee – 103rd President (2016-2017)
- Claude (Jim) Gallagher – 104th President (2018-2019)
